Lush Interlude is an album by bandleader and pianist Stan Kenton featuring performances of Kenton's signature compositions from the 1940s in new arrangements featuring a large string section along with the Kenton trombones. The trumpet and sax sections were omitted and Bud Shank's solo flute is the only woodwind utilized. Recorded in 1958, the album was released on the Capitol label.

Reception

The Allmusic review by Scott Yanow noted "Some of the music is quite romantic (particularly "Interlude" and "Opus in Pastels") and the renditions of such tunes as "Concerto to End All Concertos," "Collaboration," and "Artistry in Rhythm" certainly sound much different than the originals. A successful and often-haunting effort, well worth exploring".

Track listing
All compositions by Stan Kenton except where noted.
 "Interlude" (Pete Rugolo) - 4:21  
 "Collaboration" (Rugolo, Kenton) - 4:21  
 "Opus in Pastels" - 4:04  
 "A Theme for My Lady" (Rugolo) - 3:34  
 "Artistry in Bolero" (Rugolo) - 3:34  
 "Concerto to End All Concertos" - 6:37  
 "Machito" (Rugolo) - 2:51  
 "Theme to the West" - 4:39  
 "Lush Waltz" (Rugolo) - 4:14  
 "Artistry in Rhythm" - 4:35 
Recorded at Capitol Studios in Hollywood, CA on July 14, 1958 (tracks 1, 2, 5, 6 & 10) and July 15, 1958 (tracks 3, 4 & 7-9).

Personnel
Stan Kenton - piano, arranger
Jim Amlotte, Milt Bernhart, Bob Fitzpatrick, Kent Larsen - trombone (tracks 1, 2 & 4-10)
Ken Shroyer  - bass trombone (tracks 1, 2 & 4-10)
Bud Shank - flute, alto flute, piccolo
Israel Baker, David Frisina, Ben Gill, Murray Kellner, Lew Klass, Dan Lube, Alfred Lustgarten, Erno Neufeld, Lou Raderman, Nathan Ross, Paul Shure, Marshall Sosson - violin
Virginia Majewski, Alex Neimann, Sanford Schonbach, David Sterkin - viola
Armand Kaproff, Robert La Marcina, Kurt Reher, Joseph Saxon  (tracks 1, 2, 5, 6 & 10), Eleanor Slatkin (track 3, 4 & 7-9) - cello
Laurindo Almeida - guitar
Don Bagley (tracks 1, 2, 5, 6 & 10), Joe Mondragon, Red Mitchell (tracks 3, 4 & 7-9) - bass 
Frank Flynn (tracks 1, 2, 5, 6 & 10), Shelly Manne  (tracks 3, 4 & 7-9) - drums 
Larry Bunker - percussion
Pete Rugolo - conductor, arranger

References

Stan Kenton albums
1958 albums
Capitol Records albums
Albums arranged by Pete Rugolo
Albums conducted by Stan Kenton

Albums recorded at Capitol Studios
Albums produced by Lee Gillette